Triplophysa bashanensis is a species of stone loach in the genus Triplophysa. It is found in a tributary of the Jialingjiang River in Shaaanxi Province, China.  This species reaches a length of

References

bashanensis
Freshwater fish of China
Endemic fauna of China
Fish described in 2009